The 2014 Marburg Open was a professional tennis tournament played on clay courts. It was the fifth edition of the tournament which was part of the 2014 ATP Challenger Tour. It took place in Marburg, Germany between 23 and 29 June 2014.

Singles main-draw entrants

Seeds

 1 Rankings are as of June 16, 2014.

Other entrants
The following players received wildcards into the singles main draw:
  Richard Becker
  Nikola Milojević
  Julian Lenz
  Alexander Zverev

The following players received entry from the qualifying draw:
  Boris Pašanski
  Franko Škugor
  Cristian Garín
  Jozef Kovalík

Doubles main-draw entrants

Seeds

1 Rankings as of June 16, 2014.

Other entrants
The following pairs received wildcards into the doubles main draw:
  Jan Beusch /  Jan-Lucas Ganssauge
  Julian Lenz /  Alexander Zverev
  Jannis Kahlke /  Tadej Turk

Champions

Singles

  Horacio Zeballos def.  Thiemo de Bakker 3–6, 6–3, 6–3

Doubles

  Jaroslav Pospíšil /  Franko Škugor def.  Diego Sebastián Schwartzman /  Horacio Zeballos 6–4, 6–4

External links
Official Website 

Marburg Open
Marburg Open
2014 in German tennis